Formula Three, also called Formula 3, abbreviated as F3, is a third-tier class of open-wheel formula racing. The various championships held in Europe, Australia, South America and Asia form an important step for many prospective Formula One drivers.

History

Formula Three (adopted by the FIA in 1950) evolved from postwar auto racing, with lightweight tube-frame chassis powered by 500 cc motorcycle engines (notably Nortons and JAP speedway). The 500 cc formula originally evolved in 1946 from low-cost "special" racing organised by enthusiasts in Bristol,  England, just before the Second World War; British motorsport after the war picked up slowly, partly due to petrol rationing which continued for a number of years and home-built 500 cc cars engines were intended to be accessible to the "impecunious enthusiast". The second post-war motor race in Britain was organised by the VSCC in July 1947 at RAF Gransden Lodge, 500cc cars being the only post-war class to run that day.

Cooper came to dominate the formula with mass-produced cars, and the income this generated enabled the company to develop into the senior categories. Other notable marques included Kieft, JBS and Emeryson in England, and Effyh, Monopoletta and Scampolo in Europe. John Cooper, along with most other 500 builders, decided to place the engine in the middle of the car, driving the rear wheels. This was mostly due to the practical limitations imposed by chain drive but it gave these cars exceptionally good handling characteristics which eventually led to the mid-engined revolution in single-seater racing.

The 500cc formula was the usual route into motor racing through the early and mid-1950s (and stars like Stirling Moss continued to enter selected F3 events even during their GP careers).  Other notable 500 cc Formula 3 drivers include Stuart Lewis-Evans, Ivor Bueb, Jim Russell, Peter Collins, Don Parker, Ken Tyrrell, and Bernie Ecclestone.

From a statistical point of view, Parker was the most successful F3 driver. Although coming to motor racing late in life (at age 41 in 1949), he won a total of 126 F3 races altogether, and was described by Motor Sport magazine (in his 1998 obituary) as "the most successful Formula 3 driver in history". Although Stirling Moss was already a star by 1953, Parker beat him more than any other driver, and was Formula 3 Champion in 1952, again in 1953, and in 1954 he only lost the title by a half-point. He took the title for a third time in 1959.

500cc Formula Three declined at an international level during the late 1950s, although it continued at a national level into the early 60s, being eclipsed by Formula Junior for 1000 or 1100 cc cars (on a sliding scale of weights).

A one-litre Formula Three category for four-cylinder carburetted cars, with heavily tuned production engines, was reintroduced in 1964 based on the Formula Junior rules and ran to 1970. These engines (a short-stroke unit based on the Ford Anglia with a special 2-valve Cosworth or Holbay OHV down-draught head, initially pioneered by Brian Hart, being by far the most efficient and popular) tended to rev very highly and were popularly known as "screamers"; F3 races tended to involve large packs of slipstreaming cars. The "screamer" years were dominated by Brabham, Lotus and Tecno, with March beginning in 1970. Early one-litre F3 chassis tended to descend from Formula Junior designs but quickly evolved.

For 1971 new regulations allowing 1600 cc engines with a restricted air intake were introduced. The 1971–73 seasons were contested with these cars, as aerodynamics started to become important.

Two-litre engine rules were introduced for 1974, still with restricted air intakes.  engine regulations remain basically unchanged in F3, a remarkable case of stability in racing regulations.

As the likes of Lotus and Brabham faded from F3 to concentrate on Formula One, F3 constructors of the 1970s included Alpine, Lola, March, Modus, GRD, Ralt, and Ensign.

By the start of the 1980s however, Formula Three had evolved well beyond its humble beginnings to something closely resembling the modern formula. It was seen as the main training ground for future Formula One drivers, many of them bypassing Formula Two to go straight into Grand Prix racing. The chassis became increasingly sophisticated, mirroring the more senior formulae – ground effects were briefly used in the early 1980s but were banned, in line with other FIA single-seater formulae; carbon fibre chassis started to be introduced from the mid-1980s.

Historically, March (up to 1981), Ralt (up to the early 1990s) and Reynard (1985–1992) had been the main chassis manufacturers in two-litre F3, with Martini fairly strong in France; Reynard pioneered use of carbon fibre in the mid-1980s replacing traditional aluminium or steel monocoque structures. Dallara however, after an unsuccessful Formula One project, focussed their attention on the formula in the early nineties and obliterated all the other marques with their F393. Within a couple of years, the chassis was considered a prerequisite to competitiveness, and today Dallara chassis are ubiquitous to the formula. In order to keep costs down, their chassis have had a three-year life-cycle, with only minor annual updates. It was agreed however to extend the life-cycle of the current F308 to four years to assist teams; this chassis however, has been replaced in 2012 with the new F312 chassis, intended to be run until 2017. Most F3 championships, most notably the British series, offer a secondary class for cars from the previous life-cycle in order to provide a cheap point of entry for lesser funded teams and drivers.

F3 cars
Formula Three cars are monocoque chassis, using slick racing tyres and wings. Currently, Dallara manufactures the overwhelming majority of F3 cars, though Mygale, Lola (formerly in partnership with Dome of Japan), Arttech, and SLC also have a limited output. In many smaller or amateur F3 racing series older cars are frequently seen. Usually these series are divided into two or more classes, to allow more participation.

Engines in FIA Formula 3 are all 3.4-litre, 6-cylinder naturally aspirated spec engines. 

Engines in others Formula 3 series must be built from a production model block (stock block), and often must be sealed by race or series organizers, so no private tuning can be carried out. Honda engines (prepared by Mugen) have perennially been popular, as have engines produced by Volkswagen, Alfa Romeo, or Renault. Currently the HWA-tuned Mercedes and the Volkswagen engines dominate the British and European series, with Mugen, TOM'S–Toyota, Opel, and Fiat being used by some teams.

Car regulations
 Width:  maximum
 Wheelbase:  minimum
 Track:  minimum
 Weight:  minimum including driver
 Active suspension, telemetry, and traction control are forbidden
 Two-wheel steering only
 Two-wheel drive only (rear-wheel-drive)
Sequential paddle-shift gearbox, six forward gears (maximum), and one reverse
 Undrilled ferrous brakes
 Wheels, width , diameter  maximum
Fuel capacity: 
 Controlled fuel from a single supplier, but of a comparative standard to pump/street gasoline (petrol)

Complete regulations:

Championships and series

Until the launch of the FIA Formula 3 Championship in 2019, there has never been a World Championship for Formula Three. In the 1970s and into the 1980s the European Formula Three Championship and British Formula 3 Championship (once one series had emerged from the competing British series in the 1970s) were the most prominent, with a number of future Formula One champions coming from them. France, Germany, and Italy also had important Formula Three series, but interest in these was originally subsidiary to national formulae – Formula Renault in France and Formula Super Vee in Germany. These nations eventually drifted towards Formula Three. The Italian series tended to attract older drivers who moved straight across from karting whereas in other nations drivers typically graduated to F3 after a couple of years in minor categories. The European series died out in the mid-1980s and the national series became correspondingly more important. For 2003, French and German F3, both suffering from a lack of competitive entrants, merged to recreate the Formula 3 Euro Series.

Brazil's SudAm Formula Three Championship, which now has the most powerful engine of all Formula Three series, was known for producing excellent drivers who polished their skills in the British Formula 3 championship. Perhaps the most curious of all was the small All-Japan Formula Three Championship.  Although few drivers spent a significant amount of time there, future stars such as Ralf Schumacher and Jacques Villeneuve scored victories there. An Asian series was established in 2001 and grew to produce past A1 drivers for Indonesia and Australia.

Special races

In addition to the many national series, Formula Three is known for major non-championship races typically including entries from the national series, the best-known of which is the FIA World Cup at Macau. The first Formula Three Grand Prix of Macau was held in 1983 and won by Ayrton Senna. Michael Schumacher, David Coulthard, Ralf Schumacher, and Takuma Sato have also won there. The Formula Three Grand Prix of Macau traditionally marks the end of the Formula Three season, with drivers from almost every national series participating.

Other major races include the Pau Grand Prix (from 1999 to 2006), the Masters of Formula 3 (traditionally held at Zandvoort), and the Korea Super Prix at Changwon. These events give fans in locations not visited by other major series a way to experience major international racing.

The Monaco F3 Grand Prix held until 1997 was also a famous special race. It was restored in 2005 only, as a part of the F3 Euro Series.

List of Formula Three series

Current series

Defunct series

Special races

References

External links

Championship websites
FIA Formula 3

Regional F3
F3 Asia
Formula Regional Americas
Formula Regional European Championship by Alpine
Formula Regional Japanese Championship
Toyota Racing series

Old regulations
Australian Formula 3
Drexler-Automotive Formula Cup (Austrian/Swiss F3 Cups
FIA CEZ
F3 Cup
F2000 Italian Formula Trophy

Euroformula style
Euroformula Open Championship
Super Formula Lights (in English)

Other
BRDC F3

 
3
3
Open wheel racing